Beyond Borders is a 2003 American romantic-drama film about aid workers, directed by  Martin Campbell and starring Angelina Jolie, Clive Owen, Teri Polo and Kate Ashfield. The original music score was composed by James Horner.

Reflecting Jolie's real-life interest in promoting humanitarian relief, the film was critically and financially unsuccessful. The film was marketed with the tagline "In a place she didn't belong, among people she never knew, she found a way to make a difference."

Concurrently with the release of the film, Jolie published Notes from My Travels, a collection of journal entries from her real-life experiences as a Goodwill Ambassador for the United Nations High Commissioner for Refugees (UNHCR) — similar to her character in the film.

Plot

While attending a fund-raising gala, Sarah Jordan (Angelina Jolie), a naive, married American socialite living in England, witnesses a fiery plea delivered by an intruder – a renegade humanitarian, Dr. Nick Callahan (Clive Owen). His plea made on behalf of impoverished children under his care turns Sarah's life upside down. Attracted to Nick and his cause, she impulsively abandons her job at an art gallery and sheltered life in England to do what she can to aid his efforts at the refugee camps. She travels to Ethiopia bringing with her a caravan of essential medical supplies to the impossibly remote camp, where she finds Nick and his closest colleague, Dr Elliott Hauser (Noah Emmerich).

As Sarah's work based in England takes her to other volatile areas, where few people have traveled and even fewer have survived, she discovers that the harsh realities she encounters, and her persistent romantic attraction to the charismatic, unpredictable doctor, ignite in her a burning passion for saving lives, while risking her own in the process. She works for humanitarian and human rights organizations for ten years after she first travels to Ethiopia. At Dr Hauser's urging, she helps with another key shipment blocked by warring factions and corruption, and again finds Nick, now in the border region of Cambodia and Vietnam. Here she discovers the same nexus of war and refugee suffering but even more tightly bound than in Ethiopia. Khmer Rouge forces terrorize the camp, and Dr. Hauser is killed in a successful effort to free the camp from their grip. Upon her return to London, she gives birth to Nick's daughter, and eventually is appointed the regional representative for the United Kingdom for the U.N.H.C.R.

At the same time, Nick now finds himself inevitably caught up on the humanitarian crisis in Chechnya, and goes missing. Sarah realizes she must find him a third time and tell him he is a father, and that she can never forget him. As they desperately escape his captors, she defiantly refuses to abandon him and dies in a landmine which Nick survives. The film ends with Nick arriving at Sarah and Henry's home in England to first meet his young daughter.

Cast

Angelina Jolie as Sarah Jordan Beauford
Clive Owen as Dr. Nick Callahan
Teri Polo as Charlotte Jordan
Kate Ashfield as Kat
Linus Roache as Henry Beauford
Noah Emmerich as Elliott Hauser
Yorick van Wageningen as Jan Steiger
Timothy West as Lawrence Bauford
Kate Trotter as Mrs. Bauford
Jonathan Higgins as Philip
John Gausden as Jimmy Bauford
Isabelle Horler as Anna Beauford
Iain Lee as Master of Ceremonies
Keelan Anthony as Jojo
John Bourgeois as Rolly
Kalyane Tea as Steiger's Girlfriend
Julian Casey as Police Officer
Norman Mikeal Berketa as Police Officer
Aidan Pickering as TV Reporter
Nambitha Mpumlwana as Tula
Fikile Nyandeni as Gemilla
Tony Robinow as Art Dealer
Andrew French as Meles
Jamie Bartlett as Joss  
Tumisho Masha as Hamadi
Faye Peters as Monica
John Matshikiza as Dawit Ningpopo
Zaa Nkweta as Titus
Sahajak Boonthanakit as Port Official
Dennis Tan as Port Official
Doan Jaroen-Ngarm Mckenzie as Tao
Burt Kwouk as Colonel Gao
Teerawat Mulvilai as Ma Sok
Bertrand A. Henri as Speaker
Jasmin Geljo as Truck Driver
Francis X. McCarthy as Strauss
Manuel Tadros as Chechen Mobster
Elizabeth Whitmere as Beatrice

Production
Oliver Stone was initially attached as director and producer. Catherine Zeta-Jones, Julia Roberts, and Meg Ryan were considered for the role of Sarah Jordan Beauford, while Kevin Costner and Ralph Fiennes were considered for Dr. Nick Callahan.

The film was shot on location in Thailand, Namibia and Canada.

Reception
Beyond Borders received negative reviews from critics, as the movie currently holds a 14% rating on Rotten Tomatoes based on 103 reviews. Critical consensus on the film has it that "Beyond Borders is good-intentioned, but the use of human suffering as a backdrop for a romance comes across as sanctimonious and exploitative."

It was nominated for the Political Film Society Award for Peace, losing to Sandstorm. Angelina Jolie received a Golden Raspberry Award for Worst Actress nomination for her performances in this and Lara Croft Tomb Raider: The Cradle of Life, but lost to Jennifer Lopez for Gigli.

References

External links
 
 
 
 
 

2003 romantic drama films
2003 films
American political drama films
American romantic drama films
Films shot in Montreal
Films shot in Namibia
Films shot in Thailand
Paramount Pictures films
Films directed by Martin Campbell
Films set in Ethiopia
Mandalay Pictures films
Films scored by James Horner
2000s English-language films
2000s American films